Hochelaga may refer to:

Hochelaga
 Hochelaga (village), a 16th-century village on the Island of Montreal
 Hochelaga Archipelago, Montreal and surrounding islands
 Hochelaga, a 19th-century town eventually annexed to Montreal, now part of the neighbourhood of Hochelaga-Maisonneuve
 Hochelaga (electoral district), a federal electoral district within Montreal
 Hochelaga (provincial electoral district), a former provincial electoral district in Quebec
 Hochelaga (film), a movie about Montreal biker gangs
 Hochelaga, Land of Souls, a 2017 film
 HMCS Hochelaga, from a pleasure yacht of an archduke to a Canadian military ship and ferry

See also
 Hochelaga-Maisonneuve, a neighbourhood of Montreal
 Hochelaga-Maisonneuve (provincial electoral district), a current provincial electoral district in Quebec
 Mercier–Hochelaga-Maisonneuve, borough of Montreal